Rhabinopteryx subtilis is a moth of the family Noctuidae. The species was first described by Paul Mabille in 1888. It is found from Morocco along the northern African coast of the Mediterranean Sea (including Malta) to Egypt, the Arabian Peninsula, Iraq, Iran and Israel.

Adults are on wing from February to April. There is one generation per year.

The larvae feed on Plantago albicans.

External links

Cuculliinae
Moths of the Middle East